{{taxobox
| fossil_range =  Early Cambrian - Middle Cambrian
| image = Cathaymyrus diacodexis.jpg
| image_caption = Reconstruction of 2 specimens of  Vetulocystis catenata  (in the lower part), and the cephalochordate Cathaymyrus diadexus.
| regnum = Animalia
| superphylum = Deuterostomia
| ordo = Vetulocystida
| familia = Vetulocystidae
| familia_authority = Shu, et al., 2004
| type_species = Vetulocystis catenata
| type_species_authority = Shu, et al., 2004
| subdivision_ranks = Genera
| subdivision =
Vetulocystis
Dianchicystis
Thylacocercus
}}

Vetulocystidae is the only family of the taxon Vetulocystida, which is a group of extinct deuterostomes of uncertain phylogenetic position. Vetulocystidae is made up of the genera Vetulocystis, Dianchicystis and Thylacocercus.

Features
The body consists of a voluminous thecal-shaped section (similar to the outer shape of the pterobranchs), where there are two cone-shaped structures (anterior and posterior) and a lenticular respiratory organ; and another small section attached to the substrate.

The anterior cone-shaped structure is believed to have constituted the mouth, due to its similarity to other primitive echinoderms (such as stylophoids and blastoids); while the posterior structure (similar to that of the cystoids and eocrinoids) fulfilled the functions of anus and gonopore. Furthermore, and unlike many other echinoderms, these animals lacked a calcified skeleton.

Paleoecology
They were probably sessile, although it is possible that the part attached to the substrate produced a slow displacement. They were fed by filtration.

Phylogeny
Despite sharing certain surface characteristics with other taxa (such as Urochordata), Vetulocystida is believed to belong to the Echinodermata stem group; and that it is also related to the taxon Vetulicolia. Based on this, Vetulocystida would represent the transition from the body plan of the vetulicolians to one of the echinoderms.

Old studies suggest the following phylogenetic relationships:

However, subsequent studies result in the following phylogeny:

Both cases imply a close relationship with vetulicolians, which is supported by physiological similarities and phylogenetic analyzes.

References

External links
 Smith, A. B. (2004). «Echinoderm roots». Nature'' 430: 411–412.

Deuterostomes
Vetulocystidae
Cambrian animals